{{DISPLAYTITLE:C5H12O5}}
The molecular formula C5H12O5 (molar mass: 152.14 g/mol, exact mass: 152.0685 u) may refer to:

 Arabitol or arabinitol
 Ribitol, or adonitol
 Xylitol